Abdirahman Jama Barre (1937 – 15 August 2017) was a Somali politician. He twice served as the Minister of Foreign Affairs of the Somali Democratic Republic, and later as the Minister of Finance. He was also the 1st Deputy Prime Minister of Somalia.

Early and Personal life
Abdirahman Jama Barre was born in 1937 in the southern town of Luuq, Italian Somaliland. He hails from the Marehan Darod clan. He is a cousin of former President of Somalia, Mohamed Siad Barre. Abdirahman's brother Abdullahi Jama Barre "Asasey" was also active in Somali politics.

Abdirahman Jama Barre pursued higher studies abroad. For his tertiary education, he earned a PhD in the early 1960s from the teaching faculty at the University of Padua in Padua, Italy.

Abdirahman Jama Barre was married, and had seven children. He also had eight children from his first marriage. He enjoyed lawn tennis.

Career
Jama Barre began his professional career upon graduation from university. Initially, he briefly served as a headmaster.

In 1960, Jama Barre joined the Ministry of Foreign Affairs of the Somali Republic's early civilian administration. He received his first diplomatic post the same year, working as a counsellor until 1964. Jama Barre was concurrently promoted to Director of the ministry's Economic and Social Department as well as Director-General of its Social Department. He served as such for the next four years. Between 1969 and 1970, he was also the Acting Director-General of both departments.

Following the bloodless 1969 coup d'état, Jama Barre was named Director-General of the Ministry of Foreign Affairs by the new ruling Supreme Revolutionary Council (SRC) in 1970. He subsequently became a member of the Somali Revolutionary Socialist Party (SSRP) in 1976, sitting on the political association's Central Committee.

In July 1977, Jama Barre was appointed Minister of Foreign Affairs. He represented the Somali Democratic Republic in this capacity at the United Nations General Assembly.

Along with then Foreign Minister of Ethiopia Foreign Minister of Ethiopia Goshu Wolde, Jama Barre was also part of a seven-person Somalia-Ethiopia committee. The intergovernmental panel was formed in 1986.

Toward the end of 1987, Jama Barre was appointed the 1st Deputy Prime Minister of Somalia. Abdiqassim Salad Hassan served alongside him as the 2nd Deputy Prime Minister. Jama was concurrently named Minister of Finance and Treasury. In 1989, he was reappointed Foreign Minister, with his second term in the office lasting a year. He would hold both 1st Deputy Prime and Finance Minister positions until the collapse of the central government in January 1991.

Additionally, Jama Barre was part of the governmental Suhl (reconciliation) group, of which Abdiqassim Salad Hassan, who would go on to become President of Somalia, was a key founder.

In 2004, following the establishment of the Transitional Federal Government, Jama Barre presented himself as a candidate for President of Somalia. He lost out to then President of the autonomous Puntland region, Abdullahi Yusuf Ahmed.

See also
Somali Youth League

Notes

References
Foreign ministers S-Z - Somalia

1937 births
2017 deaths
Ethnic Somali people
Finance ministers of Somalia
Government ministers of Somalia
University of Padua alumni
People from Gedo